Rolf Nordhagen (2 August 1927 – 1 July 2013) was a Norwegian physicist and computer scientist.

Rolf Nordhagen was born in Bergen, Norway. He was the son of the noted botanist, Rolf Nordhagen (1894– 1979) and the brother of art historian Per Jonas Nordhagen. He took his PhD in Liverpool in 1958, and was a docent in nuclear physics at the University of Oslo from 1970 to 1974. He changed to being the university's director of "EDB" (information technology) from 1974 to 1986 before being hired as a professor of informatics in 1986.

Nordhagen was involved in the development and reconstruction of both the Norwegian academic network UNINETT as well as the Nordic university network NORDUnet. Rolf Nordhagen was posthumously honored with admission into the Internet Hall of Fame in 2014.

References

Other sources
NORDUNET: The Roots of Nordic Networking by Rolf Nordhagen

External links
UNINETT Official Website
NORDUnet official website

1927 births
2013 deaths
Scientists from Bergen
Academic staff of the University of Oslo
Norwegian nuclear physicists
Norwegian computer scientists